Blue Grass is a city in Muscatine and Scott counties in the U.S. state of Iowa. The population was 1,666 as of 2020.

Most of Blue Grass is part of the Davenport–Moline–Rock Island, IA-IL Metropolitan Statistical Area, but the Muscatine County portion of the city is considered part of the Muscatine Micropolitan Statistical Area.

Geography

Demographics

2010 census
As of the census of 2010, there were 1,452 people, 561 households, and 426 families living in the city. The racial makeup of the city was 97.0% White, 1.2% African American, 0.4% Native American, 0.2% Asian, 0.1% from other races, and 1.0% from two or more races. Hispanic or Latino of any race were 1.8% of the population.

There were 561 households, of which 34.8% had children under the age of 18 living with them, 62.9% were married couples living together, 6.4% had a female householder with no husband present, 6.6% had a male householder with no wife present, and 24.1% were non-families. 20.0% of all households were made up of individuals, and 7.7% had someone living alone who was 65 years of age or older. The average household size was 2.59 and the average family size was 2.93.

The median age in the city was 39.4 years. 24.7% of residents were under the age of 18; 6.7% were between the ages of 18 and 24; 26.3% were from 25 to 44; 28% were from 45 to 64; and 14% were 65 years of age or older. The gender makeup of the city was 51.9% male and 48.1% female.

2000 census
As of the census of 2000, there were 1,169 people, 443 households, and 348 families living in the city. The racial makeup of the city was 97.43% White, 0.26% African American, 0.26% Native American, 0.26% Asian, 0.94% from other races, and 0.86% from two or more races. Hispanic or Latino of any race were 1.80% of the population.

There were 443 households, out of which 35.0% had children under the age of 18 living with them, 62.5% were married couples living together, 12.2% had a female householder with no husband present, and 21.4% were non-families. 16.9% of all households were made up of individuals, and 6.1% had someone living alone who was 65 years of age or older. The average household size was 2.64 and the average family size was 2.95.

Age spread: 25.1% under the age of 18, 8.0% from 18 to 24, 29.9% from 25 to 44, 27.4% from 45 to 64, and 9.7% who were 65 years of age or older. The median age was 37 years. For every 100 females, there were 95.5 males. For every 100 females age 18 and over, there were 95.5 males.

The median income for a household in the city was $51,923, and the median income for a family was $55,208. Males had a median income of $37,135 versus $22,350 for females. The per capita income for the city was $20,811. About 3.8% of families and 4.9% of the population were below the poverty line, including 5.7% of those under age 18 and 4.3% of those age 65 or over.

Education
Residents of the city are zoned to the Davenport Community School District. Zoned schools include Blue Grass Elementary School, Walcott Intermediate School, and Davenport West High School.

Muscatine Community School District operates public schools serving nearby rural areas. Muscatine High School is the district's high school.

See also

Nebergall "Knoll Crest" Round Barn, situated east of town along Telegraph Rd. (145th St.) and listed on the National Register of Historic Places in Scott County, Iowa

References

External links

City website
City-Data Comprehensive statistical data and more about Blue Grass

Cities in Iowa
Cities in Muscatine County, Iowa
Cities in Scott County, Iowa
Cities in the Quad Cities
Muscatine, Iowa micropolitan area